Laurence de Richemont is a Head of unit Single Market Service Centre, part of Directorate-General for Internal Market, Industry, Entrepreneurship and SMEs at the European Commission since 2015. During 2010-2014 she was adviser to the cabinet of president of the European Commission, José Manuel Barroso.

For her civil service to France she received titles Knight of Ordre national du Mérite and Knight of Legion of Honour.

Education 
In 1982 she graduated from Institute of Political Studies (Service Public) in Paris, and in 1986 from École nationale d'administration (International Relations).

See also 
Directorate-General for Internal Market, Industry, Entrepreneurship and SMEs

References

External links 
Twitter
Laurence de Richemont as a French representative to European Commission in 2009
Conference: Free Movement of Persons in the EU, 12 April 2017

Sciences Po alumni
European civil servants
Chevaliers of the Légion d'honneur
Year of birth missing (living people)
Living people